Let Freedom Ring is the first extended play (EP) by Japanese singer and songwriter Hiroya Ozaki, released on 22 March 2017 by Toy's Factory.

Ozaki embarked on his first tour titled "Let Freedom Ring Tour 2017" in support of the EP.

Track listing

Release history

References

2017 EPs
Japanese-language EPs
Toy's Factory albums